This is a list of the squads of the teams that participated in the 2016 Caribbean Premier League.

Barbados Tridents

Guyana Amazon Warriors

Jamaica Tallawahs

St Kitts and Nevis Patriots

St Lucia Zouks

Trinbago Knight Riders

References

External links

Caribbean Premier League